Kaifeng is a town in Jiange County, Sichuan province, China. , it had three residential communities and 27 villages under its administration.
Neighborhoods
Wenmiao Community
Guanghui Community
Heping Community

Villages
Anshan Village
Longqiao Village
Tongba Village
You'ai Village
Baiyun Village
Guogou Village
Madeng Village
Huilong Village
Zuofang Village
Shengli Village
Zhuangzi Village
Qingrong Village
Yangling Village
Shixue Village
Miaowan Village
Gaoya Village
Baitu Village
Quanshui Village
Yingshui Village
Malin Village
Tianzhu Village
Siba Village
Zouma Village
Shiyin Village
Chaoyang Village
Shiyan Village
Qingfeng Village

See also 
 List of township-level divisions of Sichuan

References 

Towns in Sichuan
Jiange County